Cyamops alessandrae is a species of fllies from New Zealand.

References

alessandrae
Diptera of New Zealand